NRJ Music Awards 2009 is a 2008 compilation album by NRJ.

Track listing

Disc 1
 "Womanizer" - Britney Spears — 3:45
 "Hot n Cold" - Katy Perry — 3:42
 "Lovers in Japan" - Coldplay — 6:53
 "So What" - P!nk — 3:36
 "Rain on Your Parade" - Duffy — 3:29
 "C'est ma terre" - Christophe Maé — 3:51
 "When I Grow Up" - The Pussycat Dolls — 4:07
 "This Is The Life" - Amy Macdonald — 3:06
 "Burnin' Up" - Jonas Brothers — 2:56
 "Si tu n'étais plus là" - Sheryfa Luna — 3:30
 "Gate 22" - Pascale Picard — 4:15
 "Everytime We Touch" - David Guetta and Chris Willis with Steve Angello and Sebastian Ingrosso — 3:15
 "FM Air" - Zazie — 3:32
 "Sweet About Me" - Gabriella Cilmi — 3:24
 "I Don't Care" - Fall Out Boy — 3:40
 "Kif'n'dir" - Zaho — 3:54
 "Forgive Me" - Leona Lewis — 3:26
 "One.2.3.Four" - Martin Solveig featuring Chakib Chambi — 4:02
 "Si tu savais" - Shy'm — 3:23
 "Il y a je t'aime et je t'aime" - Quentin Mosimann — 3:44
 "Disturbia" - Rihanna — 3:59

Disc 2
 "Right Now (Na Na Na)" - Akon — 4:02
 "La débâcle des sentiments" - Stanislas and Calogero — 5:19
 "Right Here (Departed)" - Brandy — 3:41
 "Love Lockdown - Kanye West — 4:33
 "Keeps Gettin' Better" - Christina Aguilera — 3:04
 "Dancin' Til Dawn" - Lenny Kravitz — 5:12
 "Toi + Moi" - Grégoire — 3:02
 "Infinity 2008" - Guru Josh Project — 3:14
 "Triste novembre" - Marc Antoine — 3:33
 "Just Dance" - Lady Gaga featuring Colby O'Donis — 4:04
 "Génération virtuelle" - Olivier Miller — 3:16
 "Entre toi et moi" - Mathieu Edward — 3:13
 "In the End" - Kat DeLuna — 3:24
 "Miss Blue" - Vincent — 3:24
 "Call Me Baby (If You Don't Know My Name)" - David Tavaré featuring Ruth — 3:48
 "L'Accord" - Christopher Stills and Sofia Essaïdi — 3:56
 "Rayon de soleil" - William Baldé — 3:38
 "Win or Lose (Appena prima di partire)" - Zero Assoluto featuring Nelly Furtado — 4:12
 "American Boy" (no rap version) - Estelle featuring Kanye West — 4:05
 "Libertà" - Pep's — 3:26
 "Beggin'" - Madcon — 3:35

DVD (Music videos)
 "Womanizer" - Britney Spears
 "Lovers in Japan" - Coldplay
 "When I Grow Up" - The Pussycat Dolls
 "So What" - P!nk
 "Right Now (Na Na Na)" - Akon
 "Rain on Your Parade" - Duffy
 "Disturbia" - Rihanna
 "This Is The Life" - Amy Macdonald — 3:06
 "La débâcle des sentiments" - Stanislas and Calogero
 "Right Here (Departed)" - Brandy
 "Toi + Moi" - Grégoire
 "Keeps Gettin' Better" - Christina Aguilera
 "Si tu n'étais plus là" - Sheryfa Luna
 "FM Air" - Zazie — 3:32
 "Just Dance" - Lady Gaga featuring Colby O'Donis
 "Rayon de soleil" - William Baldé
 "Gate 22" - Pascale Picard
 "Génération virtuelle" - Olivier Miller
 "Everytime We Touch" - David Guetta and Chris Willis with Steve Angello and Sebastian Ingrosso
 "L'Accord" - Christopher Stills and Sofia Essaïdi
 "Beggin'" - Madcon

Source : Amazon.

Charts and sales

Weekly charts

Year-end charts

Certifications

Release history

References

2008 video albums
2008 compilation albums
Music video compilation albums